Karnataka Veterinary, Animal and Fisheries Sciences University abbreviated as KVAFSU is a public university, established by an Act of Karnataka Legislative Assembly which was passed on 10 February 2004.  This university has its headquarters in the Bidar district of Karnataka state, India.

As the name says this university was created for the education and control of veterinary, animal and fisheries science education in the state of Karnataka.

As many as 21 allied institutions including colleges, research institutions, veterinary hospitals among others and the employees are transferred to the new university. These include Veterinary College, Bangalore; College of Veterinary Science & Animal Husbandry (Shimoga and Hassan) and  Veterinary College, Bidar; Veterinary College Hospital, Hebbal; Dairy Science College, Bangalore; Rural Veterinary Hospital at Yelahanka; District Veterinary Hospital, Bidar of Animal Husbandry and Veterinary Services Department.

Institutions relating to fisheries which are transferred under the new university include College of Fisheries at Mangalore; Fisheries Research Station, Hesaraghatta; Fisheries Research Station, Ankola; Fish Seed Production farms at Munirabad and Shivapura, in Koppal district.

Other institutions under the university are the Institute of Animal Health and Veterinary Biologicals, Bangalore; livestock farm at Hesaraghatta; Livestock Breeding and Training Centre, Kurikuppe, Bellary; Devani Cattle Breeding Station, Hallikhed, Bidar; Killar Breeding Station, Arabhavi; Sheep Breeding, Bandoor, Malavalli; Main Research Station, Hebbal; Agriculture Research Station (ARS) at Mangalore and Nagamangala and Zonal ARS at Konnehally, Tiptur.

Undergraduate degree programmes

The university offers the following undergraduate degree programmes under a semester system in its seven constituent colleges on six campuses.

 Bachelor of Veterinary Science & Animal Husbandry (B.V.Sc.&A.H)
 Bachelor of Technology (Dairy Technology) (B.Tech (D.Tech))
 Bachelor of Fisheries Science
 Diploma in Animal Science

Constituent colleges
 Bengaluru Veterinary college, Hebbal, Bengaluru
 Bidar Veterinary College, Bidar
 Institute for Animal Health & Veterinary Biological, Bangalore
 Livestock Research and Information Centre (Deoni), Bidar
 Hassan Veterinary College, Hassan
 Shivamogga Veterinary College, Shivamogga
 Marine Fisheries Research And Information Centre (MFRIC), Ankola, Uttar Kannada
Fisheries College, Mangaluru
 Fisheries Research and Information Center (Inland) Hebbal, Bangalore
 Fisheries Research and Information Centre (Inland), Hesaraghatta, Bangalore
 Livestock Research and Information Centre, Nagamangala
 Livestock Research and Information Centre, Amrut Mahal

References

External links 
 

Veterinary medical colleges in Karnataka
Educational institutions established in 2004
Fisheries and aquaculture research institutes in India
2004 establishments in Karnataka
Public universities in India
Universities and colleges in Bidar district